The Polytechnic University of Hauts-de-France (Université Polytechnique des Hauts-de-France), previously known as University of Valenciennes and Hainaut-Cambrésis (Université de Valenciennes et du Hainaut-Cambrésis) until 1 January 2018, is a French public university, based in Valenciennes.  It is under the Academy of Lille and is a member of the European Doctoral College Lille-Nord-Pas de Calais and of the Community of Universities and Institutions (COMUE) Lille Nord de France.

Rankings  
On a national scale, in terms of graduate's employability, the university ranks first in legal, economic and management training out of 69 universities. In the field of legal training, economics and management, 99% of the university's graduates are employed. Overall, the university is ranked 28th out of 73 universities in France.

Notable people
Faculty
 Stéphane François (born 1973) - political scientist 

Alumni
 Édouard Sain (1830, in Cluny, Saône-et-Loire -1910) - artist 
 Jean-Marie Teno (born 1954) - Cameroonian film director and filmmaker
 Bruno Lanvin (born 1954, in Valenciennes) - diplomat
 Julien Dive (born 1985, in Saint-Quentin, Aisne) - politician (LR)

References

See also

 List of public universities in France by academy
 European Doctoral College Lille Nord-Pas de Calais

Education in Valenciennes
Valenciennes and Hainaut-Cambresis
Valenciennes and Hainaut-Cambresis
Buildings and structures in Valenciennes
Universities in Hauts-de-France